Venda or Tshivenda, Setswetla is a Bantu language and an official language of South Africa. It is mainly spoken by the Venda people or Batswetla in the northern part of South Africa's  Limpopo province, as well as by some Lemba people in South Africa. Setswetla or Tshivenda language is related to Northern Sotho which is spoken in Southern Africa. Setswetla/Venda is a Sotho language that was corrupted by Karanga which came with the Singo people when they invaded the present day Venda from present day Zimbabwe under Dimbanyika. During the apartheid era of South Africa, the bantustan of Venda was set up to cover the Venda speakers of South Africa.

According to the 2011 census, Venda speakers are concentrated in the following areas: Makhado Local Municipality, with 350,000 people; Thulamela Local Municipality, with 370,000 people; Musina Local Municipality, with 35,000 people; and Mutale Local Municipality, with 89,000 people. The total number of speakers in Vhembe district currently stands at 844,000. In Gauteng province, there are 275,000 Venda speakers. Fewer than 10,000 are spread across the rest of the country — for a total number of Venda speakers in South Africa at 1.2 million people or just 2.2% of South Africa's population, making Venda speakers the second smallest minority language in South Africa, after the Ndebele language, which number 1.1 million speakers.

Writing system
The Venda language uses the Latin alphabet with five additional accented letters. There are four dental consonants with a circumflex accent below the letter (ḓ, ḽ, ṋ, ṱ) and an overdot for velar ṅ. Five vowel letters are used to write seven vowels. The letters C, J and Q are used only for foreign words and names.

Unicode
The extra letters have the following Unicode names: 
 Ḓ U+1E12 LATIN CAPITAL LETTER D WITH CIRCUMFLEX BELOW
 ḓ U+1E13 LATIN SMALL LETTER D WITH CIRCUMFLEX BELOW
 Ḽ U+1E3C LATIN CAPITAL LETTER L WITH CIRCUMFLEX BELOW
 ḽ U+1E3D LATIN SMALL LETTER L WITH CIRCUMFLEX BELOW
 Ṅ U+1E44 LATIN CAPITAL LETTER N WITH DOT ABOVE
 ṅ U+1E45 LATIN SMALL LETTER N WITH DOT ABOVE
 Ṋ U+1E4A LATIN CAPITAL LETTER N WITH CIRCUMFLEX BELOW
 ṋ U+1E4B LATIN SMALL LETTER N WITH CIRCUMFLEX BELOW
 Ṱ U+1E70 LATIN CAPITAL LETTER T WITH CIRCUMFLEX BELOW
 ṱ U+1E71 LATIN SMALL LETTER T WITH CIRCUMFLEX BELOW

Luṱhofunḓeraru lwa Mibvumo

The sintu writing system Isibheqe Sohlamvu/Ditema tsa Dinoko, known technically in Venda as Luṱhofunḓeraru lwa Mibvumo, is also used for the Venda language.

Phonology
Venda distinguishes dental ṱ, ṱh, ḓ, ṋ, ḽ from alveolar t, th, d, n, l as well as (like in Ewe) labiodental f, v from bilabial fh, vh (the last two are slightly rounded). There are no clicks. As in other South African languages like Zulu, ph, ṱh, th, kh are aspirated and the "plain" stops p, ṱ, t, and k are ejective.

Vowels
There are five vowel sounds: .

Consonants

Labiovelar sounds occur as alternatives to labiopalatal sounds and may also be pronounced .

Tones
Venda has a specified tone, with unmarked syllables having a low tone. Phonetic falling tone occurs only in sequences of more than one vowel or on the penultimate syllable if the vowel is long. Tone patterns exist independently of the consonants and vowels of a word and so they are word tones. Venda tone also follows Meeussen's rule: when a word beginning with a high tone is preceded by that high tone, the initial high tone is lost. (That is, there cannot be two adjacent marked high tones in a word, but high tone spreads allophonically to a following non-tonic ("low"-tone) syllable.) There are only a few tone patterns in Venda words (no tone, a single high tone on some syllable, two non-adjacent high tones), which behave as follows:

References

Sources
G. Poulos, A linguistic analysis of Venda, 1990.

External links

Tshivenḓa Grammar Guide by Zach Gershkoff, US Peace Corps (2012).
PanAfrican L10n page on Venda
Young kasahorow Dictionary in Venda

Software
 Translate.org.za Project to translate Free and Open Source Software into all the official languages of South Africa, including Venda

 
Southern Bantu languages
Languages of South Africa
Languages of Zimbabwe